Tasos Mitropoulos (born 23 August 1957) is a Greek politician and former professional footballer who played as a midfielder.

Playing career
Mitropoulos was born in Volos, and started his football career at local team Aris Petroupoli. In 1976, he joined Ethnikos Piraeus, where he played five seasons. In 1981, he moved on to the largest Piraeus club, Olympiacos, winning three league titles and two Greek cup titles with the team.

Mitropoulos later played two seasons for AEK, winning two league titles with them, and for Olympiacos' fierce rivals Panathinaikos, albeit only one game. He returned to Olympiacos in 1997 for a final season, retiring at almost 41. He was given the nickname "Rambo" by Olympiacos fans.

Mitropoulos was also a prominent Greece national team player between 1978 and 1994, playing 76 matches and scoring 8 goals. He played at the 1994 World Cup.

Post-playing career
After retiring from playing in 1998, Mitropoulos became an assistant coach to Dusan Bajevic, Alberto Bigon, Yannis Matzourakis and Takis Lemonis in Olympiacos. As an assistant coach, he celebrated four consecutive Greek Championships in 1999, 2000, 2001 and 2002.

After retiring, Mitropoulos became a politician serving in the Piraeus city council. He ran for Parliament in 2004 for the New Democracy party.

Honours
Olympiacos
Greek Championship: 1982, 1983, 1987, 1998
Greek Cup: 1990, 1992

AEK Athens
Greek Championship: 1993, 1994

Panathinaikos
Greek Championship: 1995
Greek Cup: 1995
Greek Super Cup: 1994

External links

Phantis Wiki entry

1957 births
Living people
Footballers from Volos
Greek footballers
Association football midfielders
Greece international footballers
1994 FIFA World Cup players
Apollon Smyrnis F.C. players
AEK Athens F.C. players
Ethnikos Piraeus F.C. players
Iraklis Thessaloniki F.C. players
Olympiacos F.C. players
Panathinaikos F.C. players
Veria F.C. players
Greek sportsperson-politicians
Super League Greece players